Lamellipalpus is an Asian genus of fireflies or glow-worms in the subfamily Ototretinae.

Species 
BioLib lists the following species:
 Lamellipalpus atripalpis Brancucci & Geiser, 2009
 Lamellipalpus bombayensis Maulik, 1921
 Lamellipalpus brendelli Wittmer, 1995
 Lamellipalpus constantini Brancucci & Geiser, 2007
 Lamellipalpus flavomarginatus Brancucci & Geiser, 2009
 Lamellipalpus kubani Brancucci & Geiser, 2009
 Lamellipalpus longipalpis Brancucci & Geiser, 2009
 Lamellipalpus manipurensis Maulik, 1921
 Lamellipalpus nepalensis Brancucci & Geiser, 2009
 Lamellipalpus nigripennis (Pascoe, 1887)
 Lamellipalpus pacholatkoi Brancucci & Geiser, 2009
 Lamellipalpus sinuaticollis Brancucci & Geiser, 2009
 Lamellipalpus unicolor Kawashima, 2010

References

External links
 
 Illustrations of Lamellipalpus constantini: Researchgate

Lampyridae genera
Beetles of Asia